Ulmus 'Concavaefolia' may refer to:

Ulmus glabra 'Concavaefolia'
Ulmus minor 'Concavaefolia'